Valerio Bonini (9 September 1924 – 15 December 2003) was an Italian racing cyclist. He rode in the 1950 Tour de France.

References

External links
 

1924 births
2003 deaths
Italian male cyclists
Place of birth missing
Sportspeople from the Province of Arezzo
Cyclists from Tuscany